Marilyn Erskine (born April 24, 1926) is an American actress who started performing at the age of three on radio, and has since appeared in radio, theater, film and television roles from the 1920s through the 1970s.

Personal life
Erskine was born in Rochester, New York on April 24, 1926, and starred in movies from early childhood. Erskine married Hollywood producer and director Stanley Kramer in May 1945. The marriage was annulled two months later. She later remarried, to insurance executive Charles Curland in 1955, and had two children. Their home in Brentwood, California was featured in an article in the Fall 1958 issue of Architectural Digest.

Radio career
Erskine started her performing career at the age of three years, appearing  on a local radio show in Buffalo, New York. She also appeared on the nationwide CBS radio show Let's Pretend sometime between 1929 and 1937, where children played all the roles in adaptions of fairy tales and other children's stories. She played Gail Carver in the soap opera Lora Lawton, which ran on NBC 1943-1950, Jane Brown on Young Widder Brown, which ran on NBC 1938-1956, and Cherry Martin in The Romance of Helen Trent, which ran on CBS 1933-1960. Erskine performed the role of Jane Baxter in Orson Welles's Mercury Theatre on the Air adaptation of Seventeen (October 16, 1938).

In 1945, Erskine was a member of the cast of the syndicated comedy Keeping Up with Wigglesworth.

Theater career

As a teenager, she appeared in at least nine Broadway productions in New York City:
 Excursion (playing Eileen Loschavio) April 9, 1937 - July ?, 1937
 The Ghost of Yankee Doodle (playing Patience Garrison) November 22, 1937 - January ?,  1938
 Our Town (playing Rebecca Gibbs) February 4, 1938 - November 19, 1938
 The Primrose Path (playing Eva Wallace) January 4, 1939 - May ?, 1939
 Goodbye in the Night (playing Gertie) March 18–23, 1940
 Ring Around Elizabeth (playing Mercedes) November 17–25, 1941
 What Big Ears! (playing Betty Leeds) April 20–25, 1942
 Nine Girls (playing Shirley) January 13–16, 1943
 Pretty Little Parlor (playing Anastasia) April 17–22, 1944

As an adult, she appeared in at least one Broadway production in New York City and several Off-Broadway plays:
 The Linden Tree (playing Dinah Linden) March 2–6, 1948
 Our Town (playing Emily Webb) 1953 - 1955

Film career

Erskine appeared in several Hollywood movies in the early 1950s:
 Westward the Women (1951) playing Jean Johnson
 Above and Beyond (1952) playing Marge Bratton
 The Girl in White (1952) playing Nurse Jane Doe
 Just This Once (1952) playing Gertrude Crome
 The Eddie Cantor Story (1953) playing Ida Tobias Cantor
 A Slight Case of Larceny (1953) playing Mrs. Emily Clopp
 Confidentially Connie (1953) playing Phyllis Archibald

She played herself in an MGM documentary Challenge the Wilderness (1951), on the production problems faced while filming Westward the Women.  She was also one of the narrators for the MGM documentary The Hoaxters (1953), a short history of Communism.

Television career
Erskine appeared in almost every anthology drama series of the Golden Age of Television, from General Electric Theater to Westinghouse Studio One to Science Fiction Theater to Lux Video Theater to Climax!, appearing in over fifty different productions on thirty different series from 1949 to 1962.  In her later career, after 1962, she primarily played roles on westerns and crime dramas.

She was co-starred on the television series The Tom Ewell Show, playing Tom's wife, Frances Potter. This sitcom ran from September 1960 through May 1961 on CBS. She was a co-presenter for the Short Subject Awards category of the 26th Annual Academy Awards in 1954, and appeared as herself in the last episode of The NBC Comedy Hour June 10, 1956.

She made two guest appearances on Perry Mason starring Raymond Burr. In 1964 she played Susan Pelham in "The Case of the Careless Kidnapper," and in 1966 she played Mirabel Corum in "The Case of the Unwelcome Well." Her last role on television was in 1972, in the Ironside TV series, also starring Burr.

References

External links

1926 births
Living people
20th-century American actresses
21st-century American women
American film actresses
American television actresses
American radio actresses
American stage actresses
American child actresses
Actresses from Rochester, New York